Bondara is one of the UK’s largest adult retailers, specialising in the sale of Sex Toys, Lingerie, Bondage and erotic gifts.

History
The E-commerce website was launched in 2006 by ex-investment banker Chris Simms, with just a £60,000 investment. Bondara now has an annual turnover of over £10 million with more than 1.5 million orders shipped every year from its 20,000 sq ft warehouse in Saffron Walden, Essex.

Retail
It stocks a wide range of international brands, such as Durex and Fleshlight, as well as its own designs.

Bondara sub-brands include Glacier glass sex toys, Bondara Babes realistic Sex Dolls, Bondara Essentials sex aids and Bondara Flirt lingerie, amongst others.

Timeline
 2006 – Bondara is launched by ex-investment banker Chris Simms with just a £60,000 investment.
 2011 – Bondara relocates to a new 20,000 sq ft warehouse in Saffron Walden, Essex, to keep up with growing demand and popularity
 2012 – Bondara starts stocking packers for transgender inclusivity, with the range later expanding to include breast forms and packer pants.
 2014 – Bondara features in an episode of ITV2’s ‘The Office Xmas Party’
2014 – Bondara releases information about plans for the ‘SexFit’; a wearable cock ring that tracks stamina and sexual performance
 2015 – In time for the UK’s general election, Bondara runs a “General Erection” and creates inflatable sex doll replicas of party leaders David Cameron, Ed Miliband, Nick Clegg, Nigel Farage and Natalie Bennett
2015 – Bondara stars in Channel 4's ‘Sex Toy Secrets’, a six-part miniseries
2015 – Bondara builds the “Rubber Throne”, a parody of ‘Game of Thrones’’ Iron Throne made from Dildos , to celebrate the release of their new ‘Game of Bones’ range.
2015 – Bondara releases a report entitled the ‘Future of Sex’, in partnership with FuturistDr Ian Pearson
2017 – Bondara sponsors the FemDom Ball; an annual, UK-based BDSM event. Bondara continues to sponsor the FemDom Ball in 2018 and 2019.
2017 – Bondara becomes one of the first UK retailers to stock its own range of life-size, realistic sex dolls, named the ‘Bondara Babes’.
2017 – Bondara is the first in the industry to release a Sex Toy Advent Calendar. 
2018 – Bondara releases a limited-edition rainbow rabbit vibrator for Pride, with 10% of proceeds donated to the LGBT Foundation.
2018 – Bondara launches a national survey looking into the UK’s sexual fantasies and fetishes.
2019 – BBC Radio 1 visits Bondara as one of its ‘Approved Workplaces’. Presenter Arielle Free interviews staff and Bondara features on Scott Mills’ and Chris Stark’s afternoon show.
2019 – Bondara and LGBT Foundation collaborate again as Bondara releases a limited-edition rainbow dildo alongside a ‘Pride Shop’, with 10% of all proceeds donated to charity.
2019 – Bondara features in Channel 5's ‘The Lesbian Guide to Straight Sex’
2020 – Bondara are to sponsor the UK’s first Fetish Awards, held in London

Awards
 2012 Winner– 'Erotic Trade Only' Magazine Best Online Retailer.
 2015 Winner– 'Erotic Trade Only' Magazine Best Online Retailer.
 2016 Nominated – 'Erotic Trade Only' Magazine Best Online Retailer.
 2017 Nominated – 'Erotic Trade Only' Magazine Best Online Retailer.
 2018 Nominated – 'Erotic Trade Only' Magazine Best Online Retailer.
 2019 Nominated – 'Erotic Trade Only' Magazine Best Online Retailer.
 2020 Nominated – 'Erotic Trade Only' Magazine Best Online Retailer.

References

Companies based in Essex
Lingerie retailers
Sex toy manufacturers